Voivodeship Road 118 (abbreviated DW 118) is a route in the Polish voivodeship roads network. The route links Średnica with Nowe Dwory.

Important settlements along the route

Średnica
Zielonowo
Nowe Dwory

Route plan

References

118